Zabrus guildensis is a species of brown coloured ground beetle in the Polysitus subgenus that is endemic to Morocco.

References

Beetles described in 1932
Beetles of North Africa
Endemic fauna of Morocco
Zabrus